Bernard Lodge (born 1933) is a British graphic designer. He worked for the BBC from 1959 to 1977 before launching a freelance career. He has been described by the Open University as a pioneer of graphic design in television.

Lodge attended the Royal College of Art and joined the BBC graphics department. He is known for his work on the science-fiction television series Doctor Who, for which he designed the first four series logos. He also designed and engineered the first five title sequences. These include the 'howlaround' versions and the 'slit-scan' time tunnel versions. In 1974, Lodge won a Royal Television Society Award for Best Graphics, becoming one of the first people involved in Doctor Who to win an award for his work. His designs were used until 1980, when Sid Sutton was appointed as the designer of a new title sequence by incoming producer John Nathan-Turner.

After leaving the BBC, he worked on films, including Ridley Scott's Alien and Blade Runner.

References

External links

1933 births
Alumni of the Royal College of Art
British graphic designers
Living people